The megabat tribe Macroglossini is within the subfamily Pteropodinae

Tribe Macroglossini
 Genus Macroglossus - long-tongued fruit bats
Long-tongued nectar bat, Macroglossus minimus
Long-tongued fruit bat, Macroglossus sobrinus
 Genus Melonycteris
Fardoulis's blossom bat, Melonycteris fardoulisi
Black-bellied fruit bat, Melonycteris melanops
Woodford's fruit bat, Melonycteris woodfordi
 Genus Notopteris - long-tailed fruit bats
Long-tailed fruit bat, Notopteris macdonaldi (Fiji and Vanuatu)
New Caledonia blossom bat, Notopteris neocaledonica (New Caledonia)
 Genus Syconycteris - blossom bats
Common blossom bat, Syconycteris australis
Halmahera blossom bat, Syconycteris carolinae
Moss-forest blossom bat, Syconycteris hobbit

Megabats
Mammal subfamilies
Bat taxonomy
Taxa named by John Edward Gray